Kallela is a Finnish and Telugu surname. Notable people with this surname include:
Niko Kallela (born 1991), Finnish ice hockey player
Toni Kallela (born 1993), Finnish ice hockey player

See also
Gallen-Kallela 

Finnish-language surnames
Telugu-language surnames